Elmers Nunatak is a prominent nunatak  southeast of Mount Hawkes in the Neptune Range of the Pensacola Mountains in Antarctica. It was mapped by the United States Geological Survey from surveys and U.S. Navy air photos, 1956–66, and was named by the Advisory Committee on Antarctic Names for Elmer H. Smith, an aerographer with the wintering parties at Ellsworth Station in 1958 and McMurdo Station in 1961.

References 

Nunataks of Queen Elizabeth Land